Alprazolam triazolobenzophenone is a chemical compound which can be both a synthetic precursor and a prodrug for the benzodiazepine derivative alprazolam. At neutral pH it readily cyclizes to alprazolam, while in acidic conditions alprazolam undergoes a ring-opening reaction back to the triazolobenzophenone. A series of related acyl derivatives was researched in the 1980s as injectable water-soluble prodrugs of alprazolam, but were never developed for medical use. Subsequently, this compound has been detected as a designer drug, first being identified from a seizure in Spain in March 2014.

See also
 Avizafone
 Rilmazafone
 1-(2-Chloro-N-methylbenzimidoyl)cyclopentanol

References 

2-Aminobenzophenones
Chlorobenzenes
Benzodiazepine prodrugs